The Scotland national under-17 football team, controlled by the Scottish Football Association, is Scotland's national Under-17 football team and is considered to be a feeder team for the Scotland national football team. The team represents Scotland in international Under-17 competitions such as the U-17 World Cup and the European U-17 Championship.

The team has qualified for five European Championship final tournaments, in 2008, 2014, 2015, 2016 and 2017. The team achieved its best result in 2014 by progressing to the semi-final.

Coaches
Dean Gorre (2012)
Scot Gemmill (2014)  
Steven Pressley (2015)
Brian McLaughlin (2017)

Competitive record
 Champions   Runners-up   Third place / semi finals    Fourth place   Tournament held on home soil

FIFA U-17 World Cup Record 

*Draws include knockout matches decided on penalty kicks.

UEFA European U-17 Championship Record 

*Draws include knockout matches decided on penalty kicks.

Other tournaments

Current squad
The following players were selected for 2023 UEFA European Under-17 Championship qualification Elite Round matches in March 2023.

See also

 Scotland national football team
 Scotland national under-21 football team

References

External links
 SFA (under 17s)
 UEFA Under-17 website

F
Youth football in Scotland
European national under-17 association football teams